Hussainabad or Husainabad may refer to:

Azerbaijan
Hüseynabad, Azerbaijan

India
Hussainabad (Jharkhand), India
Husainabad, (Nakodar), Punjab, India
Hussainabad block, which includes Hussainabad (Jharkhand)
Husainabad, Raebareli, a village in Raebareli district of Uttar Pradesh

Iran
Hussainabad, Iran
Hussainabad, Dorud, Iran
Hosenabad-e Pain, Iran
Hoseynabad-e Ali Akbarkhan, Iran
Hoseynabad-e Mish Mast, Iran
Hoseynabad-e Amini, Iran
Hoseynabad, Abhar, Iran
Hoseynabad, Arsanjan, Iran
Hoseynabad, Asadabad, Iran
Hoseynabad, Bagh Safa, Iran
Hoseynabad, Bahar, Iran
Hoseynabad, Dehgolan, Iran
Hoseynabad, Ferdows, Rafsanjan, Iran
Hoseynabad, Halil, Iran
Hoseynabad, Hendijan, Iran
Hoseynabad, Heris, Iran
Hoseynabad, Jarqavieh Sofla, Iran
Hoseynabad, Kashan, Iran
Hoseynabad, Kavirat, Iran
Hoseynabad, Khodabandeh, Iran
Hoseynabad, Komijan, Iran
Hoseynabad, Nahavand, Iran
Hoseynabad, Najafabad, Iran
Hoseynabad, Saduq, Iran
Hoseynabad, Sanandaj, Iran
Hoseynabad, Saveh, Iran
Hoseynabad, Kuhin, Iran
Hoseynabad, Malekan, Iran
Husainabad, Sarband, Iran
Husainabad, Zalian, Iran
Hoseynabad, Tarom Sofla, Iran
Hoseynabad, Takestan, Iran
Hoseynabad, Tiran and Karvan, Iran
Hoseynabad (31°05′ N 53°20′ E), Abarkuh, Iran
Hoseynabad-e Akhund, Kerman, Iran
Hoseynabad-e Alizadeh, Iran
Hoseynabad-e Asheq, Iran
Hoseynabad-e Baba Khanjar, Iran
Hoseynabad-e Derakhti, Iran
Hoseynabad-e Do, Sirjan, Iran
Hoseynabad-e Dula, Iran
Hoseynabad-e Gorgan, Iran
Hoseynabad-e Hajji Ali Naqi, Iran
Hoseynabad-e Jarandaq, Iran
Hoseynabad-e Khan, Sar Asiab-e Farsangi, Iran
Hoseynabad-e Deh Boneh, Iran
Hoseynabad-e Gavahi, Iran
Hoseynabad-e Ghinab, Iran
Hoseynabad-e Jadid, Iran
Hoseynabad-e Latka, Iran
Hoseynabad-e Nazem, Iran
Hoseynabad-e Pur Akbari, Iran
Hoseynabad-e Sarzeh, Iran
Hoseynabad-e Shamlu, Iran
Hoseynabad-e Yek, Kerman, Iran
Hoseynabad-e Rashtkhvar, Iran
Hoseynabad-e Zarand, Iran
Hoseynabad, Behbahan, Iran
Hoseynabad, Jam, Iran
Kani Hoseynbag, Iran
Qavamiyeh, Iran

Pakistan
Hussainabad (Sindh), Pakistan
Hussainabad (Hunza), Pakistan
Hussainabad (Karachi), Pakistan
Hussainabad (Bhawana), Pakistan
HussainAbad (Khairpur), Sindh, Pakistan
HussainAbad (Skardu), Gilgit Baltistan, Pakistan

See also
Hoseynabad (disambiguation)